was a Japanese domain of the Edo period, located in Shimōsa Province (the northern portion of modern-day Chiba Prefecture), Japan. It was centered on Takaoka jin'ya in what is now the city of Narita, Chiba and town of Shimofusa, Chiba.

History
Takaoka Domain was founded for Inoue Masashige, a close retainer of Tokugawa Hidetada and Tokugawa Iemitsu, who rose to prominence after the Osaka Summer Campaign. He subsequently served as a metsuke, and played an important role in the persecution and eradication of Kirishitan religion from Japan. After the suppression of the Shimabara Rebellion, he was raised to the status of a 10,000 koku daimyō and assigned the newly formed Takaoka Domain. 

However, Masashige never actually visited his domains, dividing his time between Edo and Nagasaki on official duties, and his revenues were increased to 13,000 koku in 1644. His son, Inoue Masakiyo likewise spent his time in Edo, but giving up 1500 koku in revenue to his younger his brothers. Inoue Masaakira was the first daimyō of Takaoka to actually live within the domain. He also surrendered 1500 koku to his younger brothers, leaving the domain at the 10,000 koku level.  

During the Boshin War, the domain quickly supported the Satchō Alliance. After the Battle of Ueno, the final daimyō of Takaoka, Inoue Masanori, submitted to the Meiji government. He was appointed domain governor under the new administration, until the abolition of the han system in July 1871 and subsequently served in the police forces of the new government and became a viscount under the kazoku peerage. The former Takaoka Domain was absorbed into the new Chiba Prefecture.

Holdings at the end of the Edo period
As with most domains in the han system, Takaoka Domain consisted of several discontinuous territories calculated to provide the assigned kokudaka, based on periodic cadastral surveys and projected agricultural yields. 

Shimōsa Province
1 village in Imba District
11 villages in Katori District
11 villages in Sōma District
Kazusa Province
10 villages in Ichihara District
1 village in Kamihabu District
 2 villages in Yamabe District
2 villages in Musha District

List of daimyō
  Inoue clan (fudai) 1640-1971

References

External links
 Takaoka on "Edo 300 HTML"

Notes

Domains of Japan
1640 establishments in Japan
States and territories established in 1640
1871 disestablishments in Japan
States and territories disestablished in 1871
Shimōsa Province
History of Chiba Prefecture